The 1975 Walker Cup, the 25th Walker Cup Match, was played on 28 and 29 May 1975, on the Old Course at St Andrews, Scotland. The event was won by the United States 15½ to 8½.

Format
The format for play on Wednesday and Thursday was the same. There were four matches of foursomes in the morning and eight singles matches in the afternoon. In all, 24 matches were played.

Each of the 24 matches was worth one point in the larger team competition. If a match was all square after the 18th hole extra holes were not played. Rather, each side earned ½ a point toward their team total. The team that accumulated at least 12½ points won the competition. If the two teams were tied, the previous winner would retain the trophy.

Teams
Ten players for the United States and Great Britain & Ireland participated in the event plus one non-playing captain for each team.

Great Britain & Ireland
 & 
Captain:  David Marsh
 John Davies
 Richard Eyles
 Charlie Green
 Peter Hedges
 Ian Hutcheon
 Mark James
 George Macgregor
 Pat Mulcare
 Martin Poxon
 Hugh Stuart

United States

Captain: Ed Updegraff
George Burns
William C. Campbell
Vinny Giles
John Grace
Jay Haas
Gary Koch
Jerry Pate
Dick Siderowf
Craig Stadler
Curtis Strange

Wednesday's matches

Morning foursomes

Afternoon singles

Thursday's matches

Morning foursomes

Afternoon singles

References

Walker Cup
Golf tournaments in Scotland
Walker Cup
Walker Cup
Walker Cup